Jon or Jonathan Cooper may refer to:
Jon Cooper (ice hockey) (born 1967), Canadian-American ice hockey coach
Jon Cooper (American football) (born 1986), American football center
Jonathan Cooper (born 1990), American football guard
Jonathan Cooper (bioengineering) (born 1961), professor of bioengineering 
Jonathan Cooper (priest) (1820–1898), Irish priest
Jonathan Cooper (lawyer) (1962–2021), British barrister and human rights activist
Jonathon Cooper (born 1998), American football defensive end

See also
John Cooper (disambiguation)
Johnny Cooper (disambiguation)